Augie T. (born Augusto E. Tulba in 1968) is an American politician and member of the Honolulu City Council.  Tulba is a Radio personality on KPHI, branded as "Shaka 96.7", based in Honolulu, Hawaii. He was also a successful radio personality on KDNN and on KQMQ-FM.  He started his career in comedy in the 1990s, but came to prominence in the 2000s. He was influenced by Rap Reiplinger. Augie T also does voice-over work for local radio and television advertisements. In March 2019, he held his final public comedy show.  In September 2019, he announced his interest in running for the Honolulu City Council.

Personal life

Augie was born in 1968 and is the second oldest of six children. He grew up in the Kamehameha IV Housing Project (known to Hawaii residents as "Kam IV Housing"), in Kalihi Valley, a working-class area in urban Honolulu. He became a Golden Gloves champion boxer at age 16. In 1991, Augie got his first taste of stand-up comedy, taking top honors during an open mic night at the old Honolulu Comedy Club. Augie developed his earliest material with help from local comedian Andy Bumatai, who taught him that it isn't always necessary to use profanity in order to get a laugh. The surviving members of Booga Booga (James Grant Benton and Ed Ka'ahea) also mentored him; Augie had performed with them in 1993.

Augie won the Nā Hōkū Hanohano Award for Comedy Album of the Year with "Da Comedy Kahuna" in 1999. He won a second Hōkū Award in the comedy category with "Locally Disturbed" in 2003.

In 2002, Augie was voted Comedian of the Year as the funniest comic in Hawai'i by the Honolulu Star-Bulletin and MidWeek newspapers. He is the only local comedian to sell out the Blaisdell Arena ("Augie T. - The Blaisdell Arena Show" DVD) and is recognized as one of Hawai'i's Top 100 Influential Filipinos with an exhibit at the Bishop Museum. He was the recipient of the prestigious Pacific Business News "Forty Under 40" award, and can be seen on multiple TV shows, commercials, and movies. He also performed in Guam as part of the Guam Comedy Series in 2017.

On March 2, 2019, Augie held his final public comedy show with Andy Bumatai and Frank Delima at the Neal Blaisdell Arena in Honolulu, ending his nearly three-decade comedic career.

Political career
Tulba filed nomination papers with the state Office of Elections on May 26, 2020, and was elected to represent District 9 of the Honolulu City Council on November 3, 2020.

Blackface Controversy 
In June 2021, Augie reposted on Instagram a more than ten-year-old video in which he appeared in blackface in a skit titled "Hawaiiʻs Next Top Mahu"  Civil rights and LGBTQ activists criticized the video for its portrayal of African Americans and māhū, and the video was removed shortly thereafter.

Electoral history

Film and Television

References

External links
AugieT.com - Official Website

1968 births
American politicians of Filipino descent
American people of Portuguese descent
Filipino male comedians
Honolulu City Council members
Hawaii politicians of Filipino descent
Living people
People from Hawaii
Na Hoku Hanohano Award winners
Asian-American people in Hawaii politics